"Let You" is a song by English singer Cheryl, released by 3 Beat Records on 31 May 2019. Cheryl wrote the song with Chiara Hunter, Danny Casio, George Astasio, Jason Pebworth, Jon Shave and Nicola Roberts, with production by Mike Spencer. An electropop song, the lyrics of "Let You" find Cheryl telling a former lover how she allowed them to make her unhappy.

The track was met with critical acclaim upon its release, with critics favouring its catchiness and 1980s influences. Reviewers also noted similarities to her previous singles, as well of those of Girls Aloud. The song debuted and peaked at number 57 on the UK Singles Chart, making it Cheryl's thirteenth UK top 75 single. The accompanying music video for "Let You" was filmed in Downtown Los Angeles, and features the singer dancing on rooftops and walking through the city, after pushing away a lover.

Writing and production 
"Let You" was written by Cheryl, Chiara Hunter, Danny Casio, George Astasio, Jason Pebworth, Jon Shave and Nicola Roberts. The song came to fruition after the singer held conversations with her friends, about "men and relationship patterns". In an interview with Stella magazine, Cheryl stated that "Let You" is about "men who were controlling, who made me unhappy" and how "women let these relationships happen". Produced by Mike Spencer, the song sees Cheryl sing lyrics such as: "I let you lead me down the wrong track, now I've gotta own that" and "I gave you loyalty, you were on your knees". It features "juddering 80s-style beats" and a double chorus.

Release and promotion 
In April 2018, a snippet of "Let You" was posted by co-writer Roberts on her Instagram story. The song was announced by Cheryl a year later, and teasers of the song and its music video were posted on her social media accounts.

Critical reception 
Rob Copsey from the Official Charts Company commented that the song could "pass for a Girls Aloud" track, noting its "80-style beats" and "slightly wonky" structure. He concluded that the lyrics about "finding inner strength after a failed relationship" ensure that the song "is still very much a Cheryl affair". Similarly, "Let You" was described as an "80s throwback electropop banger" by Pip Ellwood-Hughes from Entertainment Focus. Lauren Murphy from Entertainment.ie called the song a "throbbing, zippy little dancefloor filler", who compared it to the work of Robyn.

Chart performance 
In June 2019, "Let You" debuted at number 57 on the UK Singles Chart, becoming Cheryl's thirteenth top 75 entry on the chart. The song debuted at number 12 on the Scottish Singles Chart and 73 on the Irish Singles Chart.

Music video 
The accompanying music video for "Let You" was filmed in downtown Los Angeles. It premiered on the day of the song's release on Cheryl's official YouTube channel and depicts the singer dancing on a rooftop with a troupe of dancers and interacting with a partner.

Track listing

 Digital download / streaming - Single
 "Let You" – 2:46

 Digital download / streaming - Cahill Remix
 "Let You" (Cahill edit) – 3:33

 Digital download / streaming - Might Mouse Remix
 "Let You" (Mighty Mouse edit) – 3:18

 Digital download / streaming - Orchestral Version
 "Let You" (Orchestral version) – 3:02

Credits and personnel 
Credits adapted from Tidal.

 Cheryl Tweedy – vocals, composition, lyrics
 Chiara Hunter – composition, lyrics
 Danny Casio – composition, lyrics
 George Astasio – composition, lyrics
 Jason Pebworth – composition, lyrics
 Jon Shave – composition, lyrics
 Nicola Roberts – composition, lyrics
 Anna Straker – keyboard
 Martin Hollis – engineering
 Joe LaPorta – mastering
 Mike Spencer – production, bass guitar, mixing, programming

Charts

Release history

References 

2019 singles
2019 songs
Cheryl (singer) songs
Electropop songs
Songs written by Cheryl (singer)
Songs written by George Astasio
Songs written by Jason Pebworth
Songs written by Nicola Roberts
Songs written by Jon Shave